Heilman Villas are located at the corner of Seventh Street and Orange Avenue in Coronado, California and consist of 10 standalone bungalows and one 2-story duplex. The duplex and 6 of the bungalows face a central courtyard which faces Orange Ave. The other 4 bungalows face 7th St.

Heilman Villas was built for Robert and Lillian Heilman. Later the complex was known as DeCoby Court and Hollander Court. In 1952, it became the Coromar Motel. In 1973, the City of Coronado bought the site; it was used by community groups such as the Chamber of Commerce and the Coronado Historical Association (CHA). The City renamed the complex again, this time to Babcock Court, in honor of City of Coronado founder Elisha S. Babcock.

Heilman Villas was placed on the National Register of Historic Places in 1992 reg. #92000319 as examples of 1920s bungalow court architecture in the Mission Revival style. The interiors contain Craftsman elements with hardwood floors and leaded glass.

The Coronado Police Department is now located on the former site of the Heilman Villas.

See also
 List of motels

References

Bungalow courts
Coronado, California
Houses in San Diego County, California
Houses completed in 1922
Houses on the National Register of Historic Places in California
Historic districts in San Diego
Historic districts on the National Register of Historic Places in California
National Register of Historic Places in San Diego County, California
Motels in the United States
Mission Revival architecture in California